Antigastra catalaunalis is a species of moth of the family Crambidae. The species was first described by Philogène Auguste Joseph Duponchel in 1833. It is endemic to tropical and subtropical areas (South Asia, Malay Archipelago, Africa), but is also found in other areas due to its migratory nature.

Description 
The wingspan is 19–22 mm. The forewings are pale yellow, veins and margins suffused with ferruginous, sometimes almost obscuring ground-colour; lines ferruginous, second strongly curved outwards on upper 2/3 ; small orbicular and discal spot fuscous ; cilia whitish, base dark fuscous. Hindwings are yellow whitish, ferruginous-tinged, termen more ferruginous ; a cloudy grey postmedian costal spot.

The larvae feed on snapdragons (Antirrhinum species), common toadflax (Linaria vulgaris), trumpetbush (Tecoma species), Scrophulariaceae and Pedaliaceae species.

References

External links 
 Waarneming.nl 
 Lepidoptera of Belgium
 Microlepidoptera.nl 
 Antigastra catalaunalis at UKMoths

Spilomelinae
Moths described in 1833
Moths of Africa
Moths of Asia
Moths of Europe
Taxa named by Philogène Auguste Joseph Duponchel